HMS Calcutta was an 84-gun second-rate ship-of-the-line of the Royal Navy, built in teak to a draught by Sir Robert Seppings and launched on 14 March 1831 in Bombay. She was the only ship ever built to her draught. She carried her complement of smooth-bore, muzzle-loading guns on two gundecks. Her complement was 720 men (38 officers, 69 petty officers, 403 seamen, 60 boys and 150 marines).

History

In 1855 the ship had been in reserve, but was recommissioned due to the Crimean War and sailed for the Baltic. After two months she was sent home again, as being useless for modern naval actions.

She saw action in the Second Opium War as the flagship of Rear Admiral Sir Michael Seymour, under the command of Captain William King-Hall. In 1858 Calcutta visited Nagasaki where she stayed for one week, becoming the first ship-of-the-line to visit Japan.

After returning to home waters, Calcutta was placed back into reserve at Devonport, Devon. In 1865, she was moved to Portsmouth where she served as an Experimental Gunnery Ship, moored ahead of HMS Excellent.

She was sold for breaking up in 1908. Her figurehead was acquired by Admiral Lord Fisher, then First Sea Lord, as she had been his first seagoing ship. In 2013 the figurehead was restored and transferred to the National Museum of the Royal Navy.

See also
James Tissot

References

Bibliography

Mackay, Ruddock F. Fisher of Kilverstone. London: Oxford University Press, 1973.
Lavery, Brian (2003) The Ship of the Line - Volume 1: The development of the battlefleet 1650-1850. Conway Maritime Press. .

External links
 

Ships of the line of the Royal Navy
Victorian-era ships of the line of the United Kingdom
British ships built in India
1831 ships
Crimean War naval ships of the United Kingdom